The Walsin Lihwa Building, or Citibank Tower, is a skyscraper office building located in Xinyi Special District, Xinyi District, Taipei, Taiwan. Construction of the building began in 2006 and it was completed in 2009. The building was designed by LCRA Architects and it houses the headquarters of Citibank (Taiwan), as well as the New Zealand Commerce and Industry Office and the Canadian Trade Office in Taipei.

See also 
 List of tallest buildings in Taiwan
 List of tallest buildings in Taichung
 Xinyi Special District
 Canadian Trade Office in Taipei
 Citibank

References

2009 establishments in Taiwan
Office buildings completed in 2009
Xinyi Special District
Skyscraper office buildings in Taipei